Käşşaf Tärcemani or Käşşafetdin Tärcemanof (1877 – 1943) was a Muslim religious figure.

Biography 
Käşşaf Tärcemani was born in 1877 in mullah's family. He received his primary education from his father, then he studied at Qazan's Märcaniä madrasah. Since 1904 he was an imam in Qazan's White Mosque, which was located in city's  area; at the same time he was a teacher in his alma mater and a mudarris in White Mosque's madrasah. In 1906 he participated in third All-Russian Muslim Congress; in 1917-1918 he was a member of Millät Mäclese and Milli İdärä. In 1917 he relocated to Ufa, where he began to serve as a qadi in Central Spiritual Administration of Muslims of Inner Russia and Siberia. In 1926 Tärcemani attended first World Muslim Conference  as a deputy head of the Soviet delegation, the chairman being Rizaetdin Fäxretdin. After Fäxretdin's death in 1936 was acting mufti.

In 1936 Tärcemani was arrested as a part of a falsified "Central Spiritual Administration of Muslims case" and sentenced to 10 years in prison, where he died. He was rehabilitated in 1956.

References

External links

Muslims from the Russian Empire
1877 births
1943 deaths
Great Purge victims from Russia
Soviet rehabilitations
People who died in the Gulag